is a Japanese professional shogi player, ranked 8-dan.

Hatakeyama's twin brother Mamoru is also a professional shogi player. They are the only twins to become professional in history and both became (4-dan) professionals on the same day.

Promotion history
Hatakeyama's promotion history is as follows:
 6-kyū: 1983
 1-dan: 1986
 4-dan: October 1, 1989
 5-dan: April 1, 1993
 6-dan: April 1, 1996
 7-dan: May 19, 2003
 8-dan: March 8, 2017

Titles and other championships
Hatakeyama has won one non-major-title championship during his career.

Awards and honors
In 2014, Hatakeyama received the Japan Shogi Association's "25 Years Service Award" for being an active professional for twenty-five years.

References

External links
ShogiHub: Professional Player Info · Hatakeyama, Naruyuki

1969 births
Japanese shogi players
Living people
Professional shogi players
Japanese twins
Professional shogi players from Kanagawa Prefecture